= Ritualcide =

Ritualcide is the systematic destruction or alteration of traditional ritual practices and their sequencing across five ritual domains akin to most cultures (birth, illness, courtship, marriage and death, which include ancestor obligations). Rituals have a prescribed form, source, and sequence that include sacred objects, places, times and seasons, music, dance, texts, songs and words, and mediators (such as monks, spirit mediums, and traditional healers and nature-infused sources, such as trees, birds, water and so on). Ritualcide primes genocide (LeVine, 2010, pp. 58-74). In particular, when regimes tamper with collective tradition, inhabitants become vulnerable and/or susceptible to spirit-based harm. As Indigenous people lose access to sources of spirit protection, their angst increases and compliance may increase due to fear of animist harm.

The term "ritualcide" was coined by Peg LeVine in "Love and Dread in Cambodia: Weddings, Births and Ritual Harm Under the Khmer Rouge", which emerged from an eight-year film ethnographic study into Khmer Rouge alterations and destruction of courtship, weddings, births, and death rituals (2010). LeVine studied ritual history before, during and after Democratic Kampuchea. The definition was expanded in 2015 when LeVine continued research as the Inaugural Fellow at the Shoah Foundation Institute for Visual History and Education and the Center for Advanced Genocide Research. In October, 2016, ritualcide was introduced at the Extraordinary Chambers in the Courts of Cambodia (ECCC) by LeVine, who gave expert witness. LeVine describes how ritual loss complicates trauma aftermath for the living and the dead, and ruptures the cosmological order that binds ancestors. Without access to reliable, traditional ritual sources, collective fear and vulnerability increase for survivors. In genocide studies, ritual restoration holds relevance for recovery by survivors and ancestors, and their collective sense of protection and cultural continuity.

LeVine, Peg (2010). Love and Dread in Cambodia: Weddings and Births and Ritual Harm Under the Khmer Rouge. University of Chicago Press and National University of Singapore Press. 2010 ISBN 978-7791-69-472-2

Work, Courtney (2013). Finding the Future: A review of 'Love and Dread in Cambodia: Weddings Births, and Ritual Harm under the Khmer. In Intersections: Gender and Sexuality in Asia and the Pacific: Issue 33, p. 219.

LeVine, Peg (2022). Ritualcide Under the Khmer Rouge in Cambodia: Animism, Genocide and War Crimes. The Routledge Handbook of Religion Mass Atrocities, and Genocide (Stephen Smith & Sara Brown, Eds), Routledge, London.
